A country is a geopolitical area–often synonymous with a sovereign state.

Country or countries may also refer to:
Rural area, the country or countryside, an area away from towns or cities
 Country (identity), a self-concept relating to an individual's attachment to a geographical location 
 Country, relating to the traditional lands of Aboriginal Australian peoples

Administrative divisions 
 Countries of the Kingdom of Denmark, subdivisions of Denmark
 Countries of the Kingdom of the Netherlands, subdivisions of the Netherlands
 Countries of the United Kingdom, subdivisions of the United Kingdom
 Overseas country of France, a subdivision of the French Republic

Arts and entertainment
Country (film), a 1984 U.S. film
 Country (2000 film), a British-Irish film starring Lisa Harrow
Country (book), published by American Nick Tosches in 1977

Music
Country music, a genre of music
Country (EP), a 2008 EP by Anaïs Mitchell and Rachel Ries
Country (album), a 1974 album by Canadian Anne Murray
"Country" (Mo Pitney song), released in 2014
 "C-O-U-N-T-R-Y", a single from American country music singer Joe Diffie's 1995 album Life's So Funny
Country Joe McDonald (born 1942), an American musician and singer

See also
 Country Party (disambiguation)